Hiired Tuules (The Mice In The Wind) is the third Dagö album, released in 2003.

Track listing
 Isaga draakonil (Riding A Dragon With Me And My Dad)
 Teine Kadriorg (The Other Kadriorg)
 Miisu (Kitty)
 Silmalaud (Eyelids)
 Öövalges (In The Silver Night)
 Sinihabe (Bluebeard)
 Vaadake paremat poolt (Look On The Bright Side)
 Kabaree (The Cabaret)
 Kaks takti ette (Star Search)
 Ahmed
 Hiired tuules (The Mice In The Wind)

External links
 Dagö's Official website

2003 albums
Dagö albums
Estonian-language albums